Sépeaux-Saint-Romain is a commune in the Yonne department of central France. The municipality was established on 1 January 2016 by merger of the former communes of Sépeaux and Saint-Romain-le-Preux.

See also 
Communes of the Yonne department

References 

Communes of Yonne